Male Dole pri Temenici is a small settlement in the upper valley of the Temenica River in the Municipality of Ivančna Gorica in central Slovenia. The area is part of the traditional region of Lower Carniola and is now included in the Central Slovenia Statistical Region.

Name
The village was formerly called Male Dole pri Šentjurju and was renamed Male Dole pri Temenici in 1997.

References

External links
Male Dole pri Temenici on Geopedia

Populated places in the Municipality of Ivančna Gorica